Siege of Coevorden may refer to:

 Siege of Coevorden (1592)
 Siege of Coevorden (1593)